Andcards is the developer of software for co-working spaces and flexible offices. The company won multiple awards in South Korea (K-Startup Grand Challenge), Poland (Poland Prize), and Chile (Start-Up Chile).

In September 2019, Stripe partnered with andcards to launch its service in Poland.

Products

andcards

andcards is a software service for coworking spaces and shared offices. andcards is currently available on iOS, Android, and as a web app.

andcards for coworking spaces includes meeting room booking system, community member directory, benefits and services catalogs, and multiple integrations to expand functionality.

Coworking Resources magazine recognized andcards as one of the best coworking space management software in 2019.

References 

Companies based in Gdańsk
Software companies of Poland
Technology companies established in 2019
2019 establishments in Poland